The 2018 FAI Cup (known as the Irish Daily Mail FAI Cup for sponsorship purposes) was the 98th edition of the Republic of Ireland's primary national cup competition. It began with the qualifying round on 21 April 2018, and concluded with the final on 4 November 2018. The winner qualified for the 2019–20 Europa League first qualifying round.

Cork City were the defending champions but lost in the final 2–1 to Dundalk.

Qualifying round
The draw for the qualifying round was made on 4 April 2018. FAI President Tony Fitzgerald was joined by Dundalk goalkeeper and three-time winner Gary Rogers and Irish Daily Mail Circulation Manager, David Vaz, to perform the draw.

A total of 20 teams entered the qualifying round, with four teams (Home Farm, Cockhill Celtic, Newmarket Celtic and Blarney United) receiving a bye to the first round proper. The remaining 16 teams played eight games, with the winners entering the first round proper.

The Irish Daily Mail offered a cash prize for the non-league team who advanced the furthest in the competition.

First round
The draw for the first round proper was made on 4 July 2018 at the Aviva Stadium, with Damien Duff as special guest. 12 non-League teams entered the draw along with the 20 teams from the League of Ireland.

Fixtures took place on the week ending 12 August 2018.

Second round
The second round draw was held on 13 August 2018, producing just one all-Premier Division tie.

All fixtures were played on the weekend ending August 26

Quarter-finals
The draw for the quarter-finals was broadcast live on RTÉ2's Soccer Republic on 27 August 2018.

All fixtures were set to be played on the week ending 9 September 2018. The game between Derry City and Bohemians was postponed until 19 September as Derry City had four players called up to under-21 squads.

The game between Longford Town and Cork City was televised live on RTÉ2.

Semi-finals
The draw for the semi-finals was broadcast live on RTÉ2's Soccer Republic on 10 September 2018.

Both games were played the weekend ending 30 September and televised live on RTÉ2. The subsequent replay between Cork City and Bohemians was also broadcast live on RTÉ2.

Final

See also
 2018 League of Ireland Premier Division
 2018 League of Ireland First Division
 2018 League of Ireland Cup

References

External links

 
FAI Cup seasons